Charlotte Diane de Foix-Candale (after 1540 – 24 May 1587) became the Comtesse of Gurson (in France) after her marriage in 1579 with Louis de Foix, who fell in the Battle of Montraveau on 29 July 1587. Michel de Montaigne dedicated the twenty-sixth of his Essais ("On the Education of Children") to her.

Literature
Wilkins, D.G.; Wilkins, R.L. (eds): The Search for a Patron in the Middle Ages and the Renaissance, Medieval and Renaissance Studies, Vol 12; Edwin Mellen Press 1996; .

External links

Foix-Candale, Charlotte Diane de
House of Foix
Year of birth uncertain
16th-century births
1587 deaths